Krzysztof Stojanowski (born 5 January 1979, in Sulechów, Poland) is a speedway rider who rode for the Isle of Wight Islanders in the British Premier League.

Stojanowski was appointed captain on his arrival with the Islanders in 2006. In 2007 he was a member of the Premier League Four-Team Championship winning team.

References 

1979 births
Living people
Polish speedway riders
Isle of Wight Islanders riders
People from Zielona Góra
Sportspeople from Lubusz Voivodeship